Beon Yeon-ha (born 7 March 1980) is a Korean basketball player who competed in the 2004 Summer Olympics and in the 2008 Summer Olympics.

References

1980 births
Living people
South Korean women's basketball players
Olympic basketball players of South Korea
Basketball players at the 2004 Summer Olympics
Basketball players at the 2008 Summer Olympics
Asian Games medalists in basketball
Basketball players at the 2002 Asian Games
Basketball players at the 2006 Asian Games
Basketball players at the 2010 Asian Games
Basketball players at the 2014 Asian Games
Asian Games gold medalists for South Korea
Asian Games silver medalists for South Korea
Medalists at the 2002 Asian Games
Medalists at the 2010 Asian Games
Medalists at the 2014 Asian Games